Protector(s) or The Protector(s) may refer to:

Roles and titles
 Protector (title), a title or part of various historical titles of heads of state and others in authority
 Lord Protector, a title that has been used in British constitutional law for the head of state
 Protector (role variant), in personality testing, a role variant in the Keirsey Temperament Sorter
 Protector (trust), in trust law, a third party who monitors and controls the trustees

Arts, entertainment and media

Fictional entities
 Protector (DC Comics), a superhero who occasionally teams up with the Teen Titans
 Protectors (comics), a comic book series by Malibu Comics 1992–1994
 Pak Protector, a form of alien life in Larry Niven's Known Space universe
 Protector, an alias of Noh-Varr in Marvel Comics
 Alexis The Protector, in the Avengers A.I. of Marvel Comics

Films
 Protector (film), a 2009 Czech film 
 The Protector (1985 film), a Hong Kong-American action film 
 The Protector (1997 film), an American action film 
 Tom-Yum-Goong, a 2005 Thai martial arts film released in the U.S. as The Protector

Gaming
 Protector (Atari Jaguar game), 1999
 Protector (1981 video game), for the Atari 8-bit family

Literature
 Protector (novel), by Larry Niven, 1973
 Protector, a 2013 novel by C. J. Cherryh in the Foreigner series
 The Protector, a 1979 novel by Malcolm Braly
 The Protector, a 2003 novel by David Morrell

Music
 "Protector", a song by Iron Savior from the album Condition Red, 2002

Television
 The Protector (Turkish TV series), 2018
 The Protector (American TV series), 2011
 "The Protector", episode 2 of British sitcom Take a Letter, Mr. Jones
 The Protectors, a 1972–1973 British TV series
 The Protectors (Danish TV series), 2009

Military, naval and civil protection
 Protector (RWS), a remotely controlled weapons station
 Protector, a version of the General Atomics MQ-9 Reaper for the Royal Air Force
 Protector, a 1901 submarine built by American naval engineer Simon Lake
 Protector USV, an Israeli unmanned surface vehicle
 Protector class (disambiguation), several classes of maritime vessel
 Protector (fireboat), commissioned in 2016 in Long Beach, California, U.S.
 Protector (fireboat, British Columbia), in Victoria, Canada
 HMAS Protector, more than one ship of the Royal Australian Navy
 HMCS Protector, a Canadian naval base at Sydney, Nova Scotia, 1940-1964
 HMS Protector, more than one ship of the Royal Navy
 , more than one ship of the U.S. Navy

Other uses
 Richard Lederer (musician), an Austrian metal musician also known as Protector
 Protector Forsikring, a Norwegian multinational insurance company
 Protector Palm Pistol, a small .32 rimfire revolver
 Protector lock, the trade-name used independently by Alfred Hobbs and Theodore Kromer for historically-interesting safe-locks

See also

 Defender (disambiguation)
 El Protector (disambiguation)
 Protector (ship), an index of ships with the name
 HMCS Protecteur (AOR 509), a Canadian replenishment oiler, 1969 to present
 Protection (disambiguation)
 Protectory, a Roman Catholic institution for the shelter and training of the young
 Protektor (disambiguation)